Long Yuwen (born August 19, 1975) is a retired female race walker from PR China.

Achievements

References

External links

1975 births
Living people
Chinese female racewalkers
Universiade medalists in athletics (track and field)
Universiade gold medalists for China
Medalists at the 1993 Summer Universiade